is a town located in Ōchi District, Shimane Prefecture, Japan. As of 2017, the town has an estimated population of 3,331 and a density of 31 persons per km². The total area is 106.39 km².

Geography

Climate
Kawamoto has a humid subtropical climate (Köppen climate classification Cfa) with very warm summers and cool winters. Precipitation is abundant throughout the year.

Demographics
Per Japanese census data, the population of Kawamoto in 2020 is 3,248 people. Kawamoto has been conducting censuses since 1960.

References

External links

Kawamoto official website 

Towns in Shimane Prefecture